Woodford Green with Essex Ladies is one of the leading British athletics clubs. They are based at Ashton Athletic Centre, Woodford, London.
The club topped Division 1 of the British Athletics League for the first time in 2005.

History

Woodford Green was established in 1908. 

Essex Ladies AC began life as Eastern Ladies AC in 1921, in 1922 became Manor Park Ladies AC and finally Essex Ladies in 1924.

Woodford Green AC merged with Essex Ladies AC in 1998.

Honours

Senior Men:
British Athletics League
First Place: 2005
Second Place: 2002,2004,2006,2008,2009,2011
Third Place: 2001, 2003, 2007, 2010, 2012

Notable Athletes

Olympians

Notable current athletes
 Tim Abeyie
 Tosin Oke
 Ronnie O'Sullivan

Club kit 
The club vest is green and white alternating hoops, with black running shorts.

References

External links
 Official website

Sports clubs established in 1908
Athletics in Essex
Athletics clubs in London
Athletics clubs in England
1908 establishments in England
Sports clubs in Essex